IndieFlix Group, Inc is an American entertainment company. Its streaming service is available on Amazon Fire TV, Roku, Apple TV, Xbox consoles, and internet connected devices including smart phones, smart TVs, and tablets.

History 
Indieflix was founded in 2005 by filmmakers Scilla Andreen and Gian Carlo Scandiuzzi, but is run solely by CEO Scilla Andreen. The company specializes in promoting independent film by providing online streaming platforms with filmmaker content. Indieflix offers an online streaming subscription for an annual price of $50 or $5 per month; additionally, library patrons may access to IndieFlix via their library, at no charge. As of June 2014, Indieflix has over 8,000 titles that include features, shorts, and documentaries, and is available in over 85 countries.

The company collaborates with filmmakers to discover efficient solutions for distribution, and provides potential access to worldwide platforms such as Amazon, Roku, Apple, and Xbox.

Indieflix has created and implemented an artist payment model called the RPM (Royalty Pool Minutes). The RPM model pays filmmakers for every minute watched of their content.

IndieFlix Distribution Lab 
IndieFlix created the Distribution Lab in 2013. IndieFlix works with schools and communities to schedule screenings of films. Some of the films released through the Distribution Lab include Living on One Dollar, Finding Kind, and The Empowerment Project.

References 

Entertainment companies established in 2005
Online mass media companies of the United States